The National Fencing Federation of Ukraine commonly known by the acronym NFFU, is the governing body of Ukrainian fencing.

History 

At the 1996 Summer Olympics in Atlanta, Ukraine performed as an independent team for the first time. It included six athletes to participate in individual competitions: S. Golubytskyi (rapier), V. Gutzeit (saber), V. Titova (epee), E. Vybornova (epee), O. Bryzgalov (rapier). S. Golubytskyi and V. Gutzeit took sixth place and the Ukrainian team took 11th place with 2 points.

At the 2000 Summer Olympics in Sydney, Ukrainian fencers were represented by three teams (rapier (h), saber, rapier (w), as well as one participant in individual competitions - O. Horbachuk (epee). Results: team of rapiers (men) - 5 place, saber team - 6th place, rapier team - 8th place S. Golubytsky took 6th place in the individual competition, while the rest of the participants did not make it to the top.

During 2004-2008, Ukrainian athletes won 7 medals. These are representatives of the young Ukrainian school of fencing: Vladyslav Tretyak, Volodymyr Lukashenko, Oleg Shturbabin, Olha Kharlan, Olena Khomrova, Dmytro Karyuchenko, Dmytro Chumak.

At the 2008 Summer Olympics, two types of weapons were supported: women's saber and men's epee. They took part in individual and team competitions and 2 athletes (Olga Leleyko - rapier, Yana Shemyakina - epee) - in individual competitions. The saber team won the gold medal, the men's epee took 7th place.

At the 2009 World Championships, Anfisa Pochkalova from Lviv won the bronze medal in the individual epee competition.

At the 2010 World Championships, Olha Kharlan won the silver medal in individual competitions, and Olena Khomrova won the bronze medal. In the team competition, 13 female sabers received silver awards. Rostyslav Hertsyk won the 7th place in the personal competition of rapiers.

In the 2012 Summer Olympics, the women's team in epee fencing took part, consisting of Y. Shemyakina, A. Pochkalova, K. Panteleeva and Kyivan O. Kryvytska from Lviv. Saber athlete O. Harlan won a bronze award in the individual event. Fencer Y. Shemyakina became the Olympic champion.

At the 2013 World Championship. in Budapest, Olga Kharlan won the gold medal in individual saber fencing competitions. The national women's saber fencing team of Ukraine won the gold medal in the team competition.

At the 2014 World Championship in Kazan, Olga Kharlan became the world champion in individual competitions among female sabers. The Ukrainian saber team took third place. Yana Shemyakina won a bronze medal in individual epee fencing competitions.

Duties of the organization 

NFFU is aimed at the further development of fencing by involving broad circles of the population in classes, and increasing the skill level of fencers.

The organization holds all-Ukrainian competitions for various ages and levels, as well as ensuring the participation of the national team in intercity competitions.

References 

Fencing in Ukraine
Sports governing bodies in Ukraine
National federations of the European Fencing Confederation